Alexander Mols (born 13 August 1991) is a Dutch former professional footballer who played as a winger.

Football career
Born in Veghel, Mols started his career with Blauw Geel '38. After a season, where he scored 20 goals in the Hoofdklasse for the club, he moved to FC Den Bosch on 28 May 2013. He made his professional debut on 4 August 2013 in a league match against Willem II (2–2), in which he came on as a substitute for Istvan Bakx.

In February 2015, Mols tore the anterior cruciate ligament on his right knee, sidelining him for a year due to the severity of the injury. His contract with Den Bosch expired on 30 June 2015, in the midst of his rehabilition. In February 2016, he practiced some time with FC Oss, before finally returning to his childhood club Blauw Geel '38 in May 2016. In May 2018, after playing regularly for two seasons at the club, he announced his retirement from football, due to lacking motivation, at age 26.

References

External links
 

1991 births
Living people
People from Veghel
Association football wingers
Dutch footballers
FC Den Bosch players
Eerste Divisie players
Derde Divisie players
Vierde Divisie players
Blauw Geel '38 players
Footballers from North Brabant